Blau is the German and Catalan word for the color blue. It may refer to:

Places
Blau (Danube), a tributary of the Danube river in Germany
Blau Monuments, pair of inscribed stone objects from Mesopotamia

People
Blau (surname)
3LAU (pronounced Blau), stagename of DJ Justin Blau (born 1991)

Art and music
Blau (album), a 2013 Japanese album by Eir Aoi
Blau, a 1974 album by Conrad Schnitzler

Other uses
Blau gas, an artificial illuminating gas 	 
Case Blue, 1942 WWII German summer offensive in southern USSR
Tramvia Blau, a blue streetcar line in Barcelona, Spain

See also

Blausee (Blue Lake), a small lake in the Kander valley, Switzerland
Blautopf, a spring that serves as the source of the river Blau
 
 Blauw (disambiguation)
 Blaw (disambiguation)
 Blue (disambiguation)